The following is a timeline of the COVID-19 pandemic in Nigeria in 2021.

Timeline

January

1 January – 1,074 cases and 5 deaths reported, bringing the total number of confirmed cases and deaths to 88,587 and 1,294, respectively.

2 January – 576 cases and 8 deaths reported, bringing the total number of confirmed cases and deaths to 89,163 and 1,302, respectively.

3 January – 917 cases and 9 deaths reported, bringing the total number of confirmed cases and deaths to 90,080 and 1,311, respectively.

4 January – 1,204 cases and 7 deaths reported, bringing the total number of confirmed cases and deaths to 91,351 and 1,318, respectively.

5 January – 1,354 cases and 1 death reported, bringing the total number of confirmed cases and deaths to 92,705 and 1,319, respectively.

6 January – 1,664 cases and 5 deaths reported, bringing the total number of confirmed cases and deaths to 94,369 and 1,324, respectively.

7 January – 1,565 cases and 6 deaths reported, bringing the total number of confirmed cases and deaths to 95,934 and 1,330, respectively.

8 January – 1,544 cases and 12 deaths reported, bringing the total number of confirmed cases and deaths to 97,478 and 1,342, respectively.

9 January – 1,585 cases and 8 deaths reported, bringing the total number of confirmed cases and deaths to 99,063 and 1,350, respectively.

10 January – 1,024 cases and 8 deaths reported, bringing the total number of confirmed cases and deaths to 100,087 and 1,358, respectively.

11 January – 1,244 cases and 3 deaths reported, bringing the total number of confirmed cases and deaths to 101,331 and 1,361, respectively.

12 January – 1,270 cases and 12 deaths reported, bringing the total number of confirmed cases and deaths to 102,601 and 1,373, respectively.

13 January – 1,398 cases and 9 deaths reported, bringing the total number of confirmed cases and deaths to 103,999 and 1,382, respectively.

14 January – 1,479 cases and 23 deaths reported, bringing the total number of confirmed cases and deaths to 105,478 and 1,405, respectively.

15 January – 1,867 cases and 8 deaths reported, bringing the total number of confirmed cases and deaths to 107,345 and 1,413, respectively.

16 January – 1,598 cases and 7 deaths reported, bringing the total number of confirmed cases and deaths to 108,943 and 1,420, respectively.

17 January – 1,444 cases and 15 deaths reported, bringing the total number of confirmed cases and deaths to 110,837 and 1,435, respectively.

18 January – 1,617 cases and 14 deaths reported, bringing the total number of confirmed cases and deaths to 112,004 and 1,449, respectively.

19 January – 1,301 cases and 15 deaths reported, bringing the total number of confirmed cases and deaths to 113,305 and 1,464, respectively.

20 January – 1,386 cases and 14 deaths reported, bringing the total number of confirmed cases and deaths to 114,691 and 1,478, respectively.

21 January – 1,964 cases and 7 deaths reported, bringing the total number of confirmed cases and deaths to 116,655 and 1,485, respectively.

22 January – 2,314 cases and 12 deaths reported, bringing the total number of confirmed cases and deaths to 118,969 and 1,497, respectively.

23 January – 1,633 cases and 5 deaths reported, bringing the total number of confirmed cases and deaths to 120,602 and 1,502, respectively.

24 January – 964 cases and 2 deaths reported, bringing the total number of confirmed cases and deaths to 121,566 and 1,504, respectively.

25 January 
1,430 cases and 3 deaths reported, bringing the total number of confirmed cases and deaths to 122,996 and 1,507, respectively.
Nigeria's first case of the B.1.1.7 variant was confirmed.

26 January – 1,267 cases and 15 deaths reported, bringing the total number of confirmed cases and deaths to 124,263 and 1,522, respectively.

27 January – 1,861 cases and 22 deaths reported, bringing the total number of confirmed cases and deaths to 126,160 and 1,544, respectively.

28 January – 1,400 cases and 6 deaths reported, bringing the total number of confirmed cases and deaths to 127,560 and 1,550, respectively.

29 January – 1,114 cases and 27 deaths reported, bringing the total number of confirmed cases and deaths to 128,674 and 1,577, respectively.

30 January – 1,883 cases and 1 death reported, bringing the total number of confirmed cases and deaths to 130,557 and 1,578, respectively.

31 January – 685 cases and 8 deaths confirmed. There were 43,732 new cases in January, raising the total number of confirmed cases to 131,242. The death toll rose to 1,586. The number of recovered patients increased to 104,989, leaving 26,667 active cases at the end of the month.

February

1 February – 676 cases and 19 deaths reported, bringing the total number of confirmed cases and deaths to 131,918 and 1,607, respectively.

2 February – 1,634 cases and 6 deaths reported, bringing the total number of confirmed cases and deaths to 133,552 and 1,613, respectively.

3 February – 1,138 cases and 5 deaths reported, bringing the total number of confirmed cases and deaths to 134,690 and 1,618, respectively.

4 February – 1,340 cases and 14 deaths reported, bringing the total number of confirmed cases and deaths to 136,030 and 1,632, respectively.

5 February – 1,624 cases and 9 deaths reported, bringing the total number of confirmed cases and deaths to 137,654 and 1,641, respectively.

6 February – 1,588 cases and 6 deaths reported, bringing the total number of confirmed cases and deaths to 139,242 and 1,647, respectively.

7 February – 506 cases and 20 deaths reported, bringing the total number of confirmed cases and deaths to 139,748 and 1,667, respectively.

8 February – 643 cases and 6 deaths reported, bringing the total number of confirmed cases and deaths to 140,391 and 1,673, respectively.

9 February – 1,056 cases and 21 deaths reported, bringing the total number of confirmed cases and deaths to 141,447 and 1,694, respectively.

10 February – 1,131 cases and 8 deaths reported, bringing the total number of confirmed cases and deaths to 142,578 and 1,702, respectively.

11 February – 983 cases and 8 deaths reported, bringing the total number of confirmed cases and deaths to 143,516 and 1,710, respectively.

12 February – 1,005 cases and 24 deaths reported, bringing the total number of confirmed cases and deaths to 144,521 and 1,734, respectively.

13 February – 1,143 cases and 13 deaths reported, bringing the total number of confirmed cases and deaths to 145,664 and 1,747, respectively.

14 February – 690 cases and 6 deaths reported, bringing the total number of confirmed cases and deaths to 146,354 and 1,753, respectively.

15 February – 574 cases and 8 deaths reported, bringing the total number of confirmed cases and deaths to 146,928 and 1,761, respectively. 

16 February – 1,572 cases and 18 deaths reported, bringing the total number of confirmed cases and deaths to 148,500 and 1,779, respectively.

17 February – 869 cases and 8 deaths reported, bringing the total number of confirmed cases and deaths to 149,369 and 1,787, respectively.

18 February – 877 cases and 16 deaths reported, bringing the total number of confirmed cases and deaths to 150,246 and 1,803, respectively.

19 February – 662 cases and 10 deaths reported, bringing the total number of confirmed cases and deaths to 150,908 and 1,813, respectively.

20 February – 645 cases and 18 deaths reported, bringing the total number of confirmed cases and deaths to 151,553 and 1,831, respectively.

21 February – 521 cases and 8 deaths reported, bringing the total number of confirmed cases and deaths to 152,074 and 1,839, respectively.

22 February – 542 cases and 23 deaths reported, bringing the total number of confirmed cases and deaths to 152,616 and 1,862, respectively.

23 February – 571 cases and 12 deaths reported, bringing the total number of confirmed cases and deaths to 153,187 and 1,874, respectively.

24 February – 655 cases and 11 deaths reported, bringing the total number of confirmed cases and deaths to 153,842 and 1,885, respectively.

25 February – 634 cases and 6 deaths reported, bringing the total number of confirmed cases and deaths to 154,476 and 1,891, respectively.

26 February – 600 cases and 11 deaths reported, bringing the total number of confirmed cases and deaths to 155,076 and 1,902, respectively.

27 February – 341 cases and 3 deaths reported, bringing the total number of confirmed cases and deaths to 155,417 and 1,905, respectively.

28 February – 240 cases and 2 deaths reported. There were 24,415 new cases in February, taking the total number of confirmed cases to 155,657. The death toll rose to 1,907. The number of recovered patients increased to 133,768, leaving 19,982 active cases at the end of the month.

March

1 March – 360 cases and 8 deaths reported, bringing the total number of confirmed cases and deaths to 156,017 and 1,915, respectively.

2 March 
479 cases and 8 deaths reported, bringing the total number of confirmed cases and deaths to 156,496 and 1,923, respectively.
The first shipment of Oxford–AstraZeneca COVID-19 vaccine from the COVAX initiative arrived at Nnamdi Azikiwe International Airport.

3 March – 464 cases and 16 deaths reported, bringing the total number of confirmed cases and deaths to 156,963 and 1,939, respectively.

4 March – 708 cases and 12 deaths reported, bringing the total number of confirmed cases and deaths to 157,671 and 1,951, respectively.

5 March – 371 cases and 3 deaths reported, bringing the total number of confirmed cases and deaths to 158,042 and 1,954, respectively.

6 March – 195 cases and 10 deaths reported, bringing the total number of confirmed cases and deaths to 158,237 and 1,964, respectively.

7 March – 269 cases and 5 deaths reported, bringing the total number of confirmed cases and deaths to 158,506 and 1,969, respectively.

8 March – 371 cases and 13 deaths reported, bringing the total number of confirmed cases and deaths to 158,906 and 1,982, respectively.

9 March – 346 cases and 6 deaths reported, bringing the total number of confirmed cases and deaths to 159,252 and 1,988, respectively.

10 March – 394 cases and 5 deaths reported, bringing the total number of confirmed cases and deaths to 159,646 and 1,993, respectively.

11 March – 287 cases and 8 deaths reported, bringing the total number of confirmed cases and deaths to 159,933 and 2,001, respectively.

12 March – 399 cases and 8 deaths reported, bringing the total number of confirmed cases and deaths to 160,332 and 2,009, respectively.

13 March – 205 cases and 4 deaths reported, bringing the total number of confirmed cases and deaths to 160,537 and 2,013, respectively.

14 March – 120 cases and no deaths reported, bringing the total number of confirmed cases to 160,657.

15 March – 238 cases and 3 deaths reported, bringing the total number of confirmed cases and deaths to 160,895 and 2,016, respectively.

16 March – 179 cases and 2 deaths reported, bringing the total number of confirmed cases and deaths to 161,074 and 2,018, respectively.

17 March – 187 cases and 9 deaths reported, bringing the total number of confirmed cases and deaths to 161,261 and 2,027, respectively.

18 March – 135 cases and no deaths reported, bringing the total number of confirmed cases to 161,409.

19 March – 130 cases and no deaths reported, bringing the total number of confirmed cases to 161,539.

20 March – 112 cases and 3 deaths reported, bringing the total number of confirmed cases and deaths to 161,651 and 2,030, respectively.

21 March – 86 cases and no deaths reported, bringing the total number of confirmed cases to 161,737.

22 March – 131 cases and no deaths reported, bringing the total number of confirmed cases to 161,868.

23 March – 214 cases and 1 death reported, bringing the total number of confirmed cases and deaths 162,082 and 2,031, respectively.

24 March – 96 cases and no deaths reported, bringing the total number of confirmed cases to 162,178, respectively.

25 March – 97 cases and 5 deaths reported, bringing the total number of confirmed cases and deaths to 162,275 and 2,036, respectively.

26 March – 113 cases and 3 deaths reported, bringing the total number of confirmed cases and deaths to 162,388 and 2,039, respectively.

27 March – 101 cases and 2 deaths reported, bringing the total number of confirmed cases and deaths to 162,489 and 2,041, respectively.

28 March – 104 cases and 7 deaths reported, bringing the total number of confirmed cases and deaths to 162,593 and 2,048, respectively.

29 March – 48 cases and 1 death reported, bringing the total number of confirmed cases and deaths to 162,641 and 2,049, respectively.

30 March – 121 cases and 7 deaths reported, bringing the total number of confirmed cases and deaths to 162,762 and 2,056, respectively.

31 March – 129 cases and 1 death reported. There were 7,234 new cases in March, raising the total number of confirmed cases to 162,891. The death toll rose to 2,057. The number of recovered patients increased to 151,648, leaving 9,186 active cases at the end of the month.

April

1 April – 106 cases and 1 death reported, bringing the total number of confirmed cases and deaths to 162,997 and 2,058, respectively.

2 April – 66 cases and no deaths reported, bringing the total number of confirmed cases to 163,063.

3 April – 50 cases and no deaths reported, bringing the total number of confirmed cases to 163,113.

4 April – 82 cases and no deaths reported, bringing the total number of confirmed cases to 163,195.

5 April – 135 cases and no deaths reported, bringing the total number of confirmed cases to 163,330.

6 April – 58 cases and no deaths reported, bringing the total number of confirmed cases to 163,388.

7 April – 110 cases and no deaths reported, bringing the total number of confirmed cases to 163,440.

8 April – 83 cases and no deaths reported, bringing the total number of confirmed cases to 163,581.

9 April – 71 cases and 1 death reported, bringing the total number of confirmed cases and deaths to 163,652 and 2,059 respectively.

10 April – 84 cases and 1 death reported, bringing the total number of confirmed cases and deaths to 163,736 and 2,060 respectively.

11 April – 57 cases and no deaths reported, bringing the total number of confirmed cases to 163,793.

12 April – 44 cases and 1 death reported, bringing the total number of confirmed cases and deaths to 163,837 and 2,061, respectively.

13 April – 74 cases and no deaths reported, bringing the total number of confirmed cases to 163,911.

14 April – 89 cases and no deaths reported, bringing the total number of confirmed cases to 164,000.

15 April – 80 cases and no deaths reported, bringing the total number of confirmed cases to 164,080.

16 April – 67 cases and no deaths reported, bringing the total number of confirmed cases to 164,147.

17 April – 60 cases and no deaths reported, bringing the total number of confirmed cases to 164,207.

18 April – 26 cases and no deaths reported, bringing the total number of confirmed cases to 164,233.

19 April – 70 cases and no deaths reported, bringing the total number of confirmed cases to 164,303.

20 April – 120 cases and no deaths reported, bringing the total number of confirmed cases to 164,423.

21 April – 65 cases and no deaths reported, bringing the total number of confirmed cases to 164,488.

22 April – 100 cases and no deaths reported, bringing the total number of confirmed cases to 164,588.

23 April – 45 cases and no deaths reported, bringing the total number of confirmed cases to 164,633.

24 April – 51 cases and no deaths reported, bringing the total number of confirmed cases to 164,684.

25 April – 35 cases and 1 death reported, bringing the total number of confirmed cases and deaths to 164,719 and 2,062, respectively.

26 April – 37 cases and no deaths reported, bringing the total number of confirmed cases to 164,756.

27 April – 156 cases and 1 death reported, bringing the total number of confirmed cases and deaths to 164,912 and 2,063, respectively.

28 April – 81 cases and no deaths reported, bringing the total number of confirmed cases to 164,993.

29 April – 62 cases and no deaths reported, bringing the total number of confirmed cases to 165,055.

30 April – 55 cases and no deaths reported. There were 2,219 cases in April, raising the total number of confirmed cases to 165,110. The number of recovered patients increased to 155,101, leaving 7,946 active cases at the end of month.

May

1 May – 43 cases and no deaths reported, bringing the total number of confirmed cases to 165,153.

2 May – 28 cases and no deaths reported, bringing the total number of confirmed cases to 165,181.

3 May – 18 cases and no deaths reported, bringing the total number of confirmed cases to 165,199.

4 May – 34 cases and no deaths reported, bringing the total number of confirmed cases to 165,215.

5 May – 52 cases and 2 deaths reported, bringing the total number of confirmed cases and deaths to 165,273 and 2,065, respectively.

6 May – 28 cases and no deaths reported, bringing the total number of confirmed cases to 165,301.

7 May – 39 cases and no deaths reported, bringing the total number of confirmed cases to 165,340.

8 May – 30 cases and no deaths reported, bringing the total number of confirmed cases to 165,370.

9 May – 37 cases and no deaths reported, bringing the total number of confirmed cases to 165,419.

10 May – 49 cases and no deaths reported, bringing the total number of confirmed cases to 165,468.

11 May – 47 cases and no deaths reported, bringing the total number of confirmed cases to 165,515.

12 May – 44 cases and 1 death reported, bringing the total number of confirmed cases and deaths to 165,559 and 2,066, respectively.

13 May – 53 cases and no deaths reported, bringing the total number of confirmed cases to 165,612.

14 May – 49 cases and no deaths reported, bringing the total number of confirmed cases to 165,661.

15 May – 41 cases and no deaths reported, bringing the total number of confirmed cases to 165,702.

16 May – 7 cases and no deaths reported, bringing the total number of confirmed cases to 165,709.

17 May – 69 cases and 1 death reported, bringing the total number of confirmed cases and deaths to 165,778 and 2,067, respectively.

18 May – 31 cases and no deaths reported, bringing the total number of confirmed cases to 165,809.

19 May – 43 cases and no deaths reported, bringing the total number of confirmed cases to 165,852.

20 May – 49 cases and no deaths reported, bringing the total number of confirmed cases to 165,901.

21 May – 43 cases and no deaths reported, bringing the total number of confirmed cases to 165,944.

22 May – 35 cases and no deaths reported, bringing the total number of confirmed cases to 165,979.

23 May – 40 cases and no deaths reported, bringing the total number of confirmed cases to 166,019.

24 May – 42 cases and no deaths reported, bringing the total number of confirmed cases to 166,061.

25 May – 37 cases and 4 deaths reported, bringing the total number of confirmed cases to 166,098 and 2,071, respectively.

26 May – 48 cases and no deaths reported, bringing the total number of confirmed cases to 166,146.

27 May – 45 cases and no deaths reported, bringing the total number of confirmed cases to 166,191.

28 May – 63 cases and no deaths reported, bringing the total number of confirmed cases to 166,254.

29 May – 31 cases and no deaths reported, bringing the total number of confirmed cases to 166,285.

30 May – 30 cases and no deaths reported, bringing the total number of confirmed cases to 166,315.

31 May – 203 cases and 28 deaths reported. There were 1,408 new cases in May, raising the total number of confirmed cases to 166,518. The death toll rose to 2,099. The number of recovered patients increased to 158,781, leaving 5,638 active cases at the end of the month.

June

1 June – 17 cases and no deaths reported, bringing the total number of confirmed cases to 166,534.

2 June – 25 cases and no deaths reported, bringing the total number of confirmed cases to 166,560.

3 June – 122 cases and 18 deaths reported, bringing the total number of confirmed cases and deaths to 166,682 and 2,117, respectively.

4 June – 48 cases and no deaths reported, bringing the total number of confirmed cases to 166,730.

5 June – 26 cases and no deaths reported, bringing the total number of confirmed cases to 166,756.

6 June – 11 cases and no deaths reported, bringing the total number of confirmed cases to 166,767.

7 June – 49 cases and no deaths reported, bringing the total number of confirmed cases to 166,816.

8 June – 102 cases and no deaths reported, bringing the total number of confirmed cases to 166,918.

9 June – 64 cases and no deaths reported, bringing the total number of confirmed cases to 166,982.

10 June – 45 cases and no deaths reported, bringing the total number of confirmed cases to 167,027.

11 June – 24 cases and no deaths reported, bringing the total number of confirmed cases to 167,051.

12 June – 8 cases and no deaths reported, bringing the total number of confirmed cases to 167,059.

13 June – 7 cases and no deaths reported, bringing the total number of confirmed cases to 167,066.

14 June – 12 cases and no deaths reported, bringing the total number of confirmed cases to 167,078.

15 June – 17 cases and no deaths reported, bringing the total number of confirmed cases to 167,095.

16 June – 8 cases and no deaths reported, bringing the total number of confirmed cases to 167,103.

17 June – 39 cases and no deaths reported, bringing the total number of confirmed cases to 167,142.

18 June – 13 cases and no deaths reported, bringing the total number of confirmed cases to 167,155.

19 June – 51 cases and no deaths reported, bringing the total number of confirmed cases to 167,206.

20 June – No cases reported.

21 June – 86 cases and 1 death reported, bringing the total number of confirmed cases and deaths to 167,292 and 2,118, respectively.

22 June – 39 cases and no deaths reported, bringing the total number of confirmed cases to 167,331.

23 June – 44 cases and no deaths reported, bringing the total number of confirmed cases to 167,375.

24 June – 26 cases and no deaths reported, bringing the total number of confirmed cases to 167,401.

25 June – 29 cases and 1 death reported, bringing the total number of confirmed cases and deaths to 167,430 and 2,119, respectively.

26 June – 35 cases and no deaths reported, bringing the total number of confirmed cases to 167,465.

27 June – 2 cases and no deaths reported, bringing the total number of confirmed cases to 167,467.

28 June – 65 cases and no deaths reported, bringing the total number of confirmed cases to 167,532.

29 June – 11 cases and 1 death reported, bringing the total number of confirmed cases to 167,543 and 2,120, respectively.

30 June – 75 cases and no deaths reported. There were 1,100 new cases in June, taking the total number of confirmed cases to 167,618. The death toll rose to 2,120. The number of recovered patients increased to 164,244, leaving 1,254 active cases at the end of the month.

See also
Timeline of the COVID-19 pandemic in Nigeria (February–June 2020)
Timeline of the COVID-19 pandemic in Nigeria (July–December 2020)

References

Coronavirus pandemic
Disease outbreaks in Nigeria
Timelines of the COVID-19 pandemic in Nigeria